The Joseph Jeffrey House is an historic house on Old Mill Road in Charlestown, Rhode Island.  It is located on the east side of Old Mill Road, just south of Saw Mill Pond and Sawmill Brook, on a predominantly wooded  lot.  The main house is a -story wood-frame structure with a gambrel roof and central chimney, with a small gable-roof ell to the northeast.  The oldest portion of the main block appears to be the easterly side, which rests on an old stone foundation, and exhibits construction methods typical of the second quarter of the 18th century.  The house was probably built by Joseph Jeffrey, a Narragansett, on land granted to him by the tribe, whose advisory council he sat on.

The house was added to the National Register of Historic Places in 1978.

See also
National Register of Historic Places listings in Washington County, Rhode Island

References

Buildings and structures in Charlestown, Rhode Island
Houses in Washington County, Rhode Island
Houses on the National Register of Historic Places in Rhode Island
National Register of Historic Places in Washington County, Rhode Island
Colonial architecture in Rhode Island